National Tertiary Route 333, or just Route 333 (or ) is a National Road Route of Costa Rica, located in the San José province.

Description
In San José province the route covers Pérez Zeledón canton (San Pedro district).

References

Highways in Costa Rica